Moneyball: The Art of Winning an Unfair Game is a book by Michael Lewis, published in 2003, about the Oakland Athletics baseball team and its general manager Billy Beane. Its focus is the team's analytical, evidence-based, sabermetric approach to assembling a competitive baseball team despite Oakland's small budget. A film based on Lewis' book, starring Brad Pitt and Jonah Hill, was released in 2011.

Synopsis
The central premise of Moneyball is that the collective wisdom of baseball insiders (including players, managers, coaches, scouts, and the front office) over the past century is outdated, subjective, and often flawed. Statistics such as stolen bases, runs batted in, and batting average, typically used to gauge players, are relics of a 19th-century view of the game and the statistics available at that time. Before sabermetrics was introduced to baseball, teams were dependent on the skills of their scouts to find and evaluate players. Scouts are experienced in the sport, usually having been players or coaches. The book argues that the Oakland A's' front office took advantage of more analytical gauges of player performance to field a team that could outsmart and better compete against richer competitors in Major League Baseball (MLB).

Rigorous statistical analysis had demonstrated that on-base percentage and slugging percentage are better indicators of offensive success, and the A's became convinced that these qualities were cheaper to obtain on the open market than more historically valued qualities such as running speed and defense. These observations often flew in the face of conventional baseball wisdom and the beliefs of many baseball scouts and executives.

By re-evaluating their strategy in this way, the 2002 Athletics, with approximately $44 million in salary, were competitive with larger market teams such as the New York Yankees, who spent over $125 million in payroll that season. Because of its smaller budget, Oakland had to find players undervalued by the market, and their system has proven itself thus far. The approach brought the A's to the playoffs in 2002 and 2003.

Lewis explored several themes in the book, such as insiders vs. outsiders (established traditionalists vs. upstart proponents of sabermetrics), the democratization of information causing a flattening of hierarchies, and "the ruthless drive for efficiency that capitalism demands". 

Moneyball also touches on the A's' methods of prospect selection. Sabermetricians argue that a college baseball player's chance of MLB success is much higher than the more traditional high school draft pick. Beane maintains that high draft picks spent on high school prospects, regardless of talent or physical potential as evaluated by traditional scouting, are riskier than those spent on more polished college players. Adding on, college players have played more games and thus there is a larger mass of statistical data to base expensive decisions off. Lewis cites A's minor leaguer Jeremy Bonderman, drafted out of high school in 2001 over Beane's objections, as an example of the type of draft pick Beane would avoid. Bonderman had all of the traditional "tools" that scouts look for, but thousands of such players have been signed by MLB organizations out of high school over the years and failed to develop as anticipated. Lewis explores the A's approach to the 2002 MLB draft, when the team had a run of early picks. The book documents Beane's often tense discussions with his scouting staff (who favored traditional subjective evaluation of potential rather than objective sabermetrics) in preparation for the draft to the actual draft, which defied all expectations and was considered at the time a wildly successful (if unorthodox) effort by Beane.

Moneyball traces the history of the sabermetric movement back to such people as Bill James (then a member of the Boston Red Sox front office) and Craig R. Wright. Lewis explores how James's seminal Baseball Abstract, published annually from the late 1970s through the late 1980s, influenced many of the young, up-and-coming baseball minds that are now joining the ranks of baseball management.

Influence
Moneyball has entered baseball's lexicon; teams that value sabermetrics are often said to be playing "Moneyball." Baseball traditionalists, in particular some scouts and media members, decry the sabermetric revolution and have disparaged Moneyball for emphasizing sabermetrics over more traditional methods of player evaluation. Nevertheless, Moneyball changed the way many major league front offices do business. In its wake, teams such as the New York Mets, New York Yankees, San Diego Padres, St. Louis Cardinals, Boston Red Sox, Washington Nationals, Arizona Diamondbacks, Cleveland Guardians, and the Toronto Blue Jays  have hired full-time sabermetric analysts.

When the Mets hired Sandy Alderson – Beane's predecessor and mentor with the A's – as their general manager after the 2010 season, and hired Beane's former associates Paul DePodesta and J.P. Ricciardi to the front office, the team was jokingly referred to as the "Moneyball Mets". Like the Oakland A's in the 1990s, the Mets have been directed by their ownership to slash payroll. Under Alderson's tenure, the team payroll dropped below $100 million per year from 2012 to 2014, and the Mets reached the 2015 World Series (defeating MLB's highest-payroll team, the Los Angeles Dodgers, en route).

In the 2019 and 2020 seasons, the Tampa Bay Rays were considered masters of Moneyball, reaching the 2020 World Series with a payroll prorated at US$28.2 million, third-lowest out of Major League Baseball's 30 teams.

Lewis has acknowledged that the book's success may have hurt the Athletics' fortunes as other teams accepted sabermetrics, reducing Oakland's edge.

Since the book's publication and success, Lewis has discussed plans for a sequel to Moneyball called Underdogs, revisiting the players and their relative success several years into their careers, although only four players from the 2002 draft played much at the Major League level.

Moneyball has also influenced and been influenced by other professional sports teams including European club association football (soccer). Beane has regarded Arsenal's former manager Arsène Wenger as a personal idol. Beane has held discussions with Wenger, former Manchester United F.C. manager Sir Alex Ferguson, and Liverpool F.C. owner John W. Henry. His friendship with ex-Arsenal scout Damien Comolli and Arsenal owner Stan Kroenke allowed him to delve deep into the world of English football. According to El País, Liverpool F.C. co-owner John W. Henry did not trust public opinion so he looked for a mathematical method similar to the one used for the Boston Red Sox (in guiding them to three World Series wins) which he also owns via Fenway Sports Group. The mathematical model turned out to be that of Cambridge physicist Ian Graham, which was used to select the manager (Jürgen Klopp) and players essential for Liverpool to win the 2018-19 UEFA Champions League.

People discussed in the book
Moneyball covers the lives and careers of several baseball personalities. The central one is Billy Beane, whose failed playing career is contrasted with wildly optimistic predictions by scouts.

Players and people discussed in Moneyball:

Oakland farm system

Barry Zito – 2002 AL Cy Young winner, part of the "Big 3" with Mulder and Hudson (below)
Mark Mulder – part of the "Big 3" with Zito and Hudson
Tim Hudson – Not drafted by Beane; part of the "Big 3" with Mulder and Zito
Kirk Saarloos
John Baker
Joe Blanton
Jason Giambi – Not drafted by Beane. 2000 AL MVP, signed with the New York Yankees in 2002 for $120 million over 7 years
Miguel Tejada – Not drafted by Beane; 2002 AL MVP
Eric Chavez – Not drafted by Beane; six-time AL Gold Glove winner
Jeremy Brown
Nick Swisher
Bobby Crosby
Mark Teahen
Jeremy Bonderman – traded to the Detroit Tigers in 2002

Oakland bullpen
Jason Isringhausen – signed with the St. Louis Cardinals in the 2001–02 offseason
Billy Koch – 2002 AL Relief Pitcher of the Year
Chad Bradford
Jim Mecir
Ricardo Rincón
Mike Magnante

Other players

Kevin Youkilis – referred to in the book as the "Greek God of Walks". Youkilis was drafted in 2001 by the Boston Red Sox and heavily desired by Beane, who tried to snare him via a failed three-team trade discussed in the book.
Prince Fielder – son of former slugger Cecil Fielder, drafted in 2002 by the Milwaukee Brewers. Claimed by Beane to be "too fat" even for the A's.
B. J. Upton, now known by his birth name of Melvin Upton, Jr. – cited as an example of "bad high school" draft pick.
Scott Kazmir – cited as an example of teams' – in this case the New York Mets – foolishness in drafting high school pitchers because of the difficulty in projecting their future, as opposed to college players.
Jamie Moyer – then with the Seattle Mariners
Ray Durham – traded to the Oakland A's in the middle of 2002, cited as a potent base-stealer and "rent-a-player": an impending free agent who would likely attract large offers from other clubs with larger available payrolls than Oakland's while leaving Oakland with draft picks in the next year's draft, a rule since abolished with the 2011 Major League Baseball Collective Bargaining Agreement. Durham would eventually sign with the San Francisco Giants.
Terrence Long
Erik Hiljus
David Justice
Jeremy Giambi
Alex Rodriguez – Beane compares A-Rod's stats to those of Eric Chavez.
Greg Maddux
Cliff Floyd
Alfonso Soriano
Jeff Francis
Zack Greinke – drafted by the Kansas City Royals in 2002
Scott Hatteberg

Scouts, management, and journalists
Billy Beane – GM
Paul DePodesta – Assistant GM
David Forst – scout
Grady Fuson – Head of scouting
Ron "Hoppy" Hopkins – National cross-checker scout
Chris Pittaro – scout
J. P. Ricciardi – worked under Beane and DePodesta as Director of Player Personnel
Sandy Alderson – Beane's predecessor and mentor with the Athletics
Peter Gammons – Sportswriter
Art Howe – Oakland manager
Ron Washington – Athletics coach
Joe Morgan – Hall of Fame second baseman and ESPN broadcaster
Steve Phillips – New York Mets GM
Bill James – baseball writer and statistician whose Baseball Abstract books greatly influenced Beane
Voros McCracken – sabremetrician and writer specializing in pitchers' defense
Omar Minaya – Montreal Expos GM

Analysis of the 2002 Major League Baseball draft

Beane's list
Beane assembled a list of twenty players they would draft in a "perfect world"; meaning if money was no object and they did not have to compete with the other twenty-nine teams.

The list, and the teams who drafted them:
Pitchers
Jeremy Guthrie – Cleveland, #22 (1st round)
Joe Blanton – Oakland, #24 (1st round Marin)
Jeff Francis – Colorado, #9 (1st round)
Luke Hagerty – Chicago Cubs, #32 (1st round)
Ben Fritz – Oakland, #30 (1st round)
Robert Brownlie – Chicago Cubs, #21 (1st round)
Stephen Obenchain – Oakland, #37 (1st round)
Bill Murphy – Oakland, #98 (3rd round)
Hitters
Nick Swisher – Oakland, #16 (1st round)
Russ Adams – Toronto, #14 (1st round)
Khalil Greene – San Diego, #13 (1st round)
John McCurdy – Oakland, #26 (1st round)
Mark Teahen – Oakland, #39 (1st round)
Jeremy Brown – Oakland, #35 (1st round)
Steve Stanley – Oakland, #67 (2nd round)
John Baker – Oakland, #128 (4th round)
Mark Kiger – Oakland, #158 (5th round)
Brian Stavisky – Oakland, #188 (6th round)
Shaun Larkin – Cleveland, #274 (9th round)
Brant Colamarino – Oakland, #218 (7th round)

Oakland's picks
 #16 – Nick Swisher – successful major leaguer, traded to Chicago White Sox after 2007
 #24 – Joe Blanton – successful major leaguer, traded to Philadelphia Phillies in 2008
 #26 – John McCurdy – never made MLB. Last played minor league ball in 2006.
 #30 – Ben Fritz – never made MLB. Last played minor league ball in 2010.
 #35 – Jeremy Brown – MLB experience consists of 11 plate appearances for Oakland in 2006. Last played minor league ball in 2007.
 #37 – Stephen Obenchain – never made MLB. Last played minor league ball in 2006.
 #39 – Mark Teahen – spent parts of eight seasons in MLB, played only in the minors in 2012 and 2013.
 #67 – Steve Stanley – never made MLB. Last played minor league ball in 2006.
 #98 – Bill Murphy – MLB debut in 2007, pitched approximately 18 innings in MLB. Has played only in foreign and minor leagues since 2009.
 #128 – John Baker – traded to the Florida Marlins and has played around 300 total games in six MLB seasons.
 #158 – Mark Kiger – MLB experience consists of  innings at second base for Oakland in the 2006 American League Championship Series. Never played in the MLB regular season. Last played minor league ball in 2009.
 #188 – Brian Stavisky – never made MLB. Last played minor league ball in 2010.
 #218 – Brant Colamarino – never made MLB. Last played minor league ball in 2007.

Reception 
Richard H. Thaler of the University of Chicago Graduate School of Business and Cass R. Sunstein of the University of Chicago Law School described the book as a "sensation... Lewis has a wonderful story to tell, and he tells it wonderfully... Lewis also raises some serious puzzles that he does not resolve, and his account has some large and perhaps profound implications that he does not much explore."

David Haglund of Slate and Jonah Keri of Grantland have both criticized the book for glossing over key young talent acquired through the draft and signed internationally. Specifically, they have argued that the book ignores the pitching trio of Tim Hudson, Mark Mulder, and Barry Zito, as well as position players such as Eric Chavez and Miguel Tejada, all of whom were discovered via traditional scouting methodology and were key contributors to the success of the 2002 Athletics. In 2002, Barry Zito received the AL Cy Young Award and Miguel Tejada received the AL MVP Award. 

Sheldon and Alan Hirsch also contended the view in their 2011 book The Beauty of Short Hops: How Chance and Circumstance Confound the Moneyball Approach to Baseball, pointing out the team being high up in allowing runs less other teams as opposed to being high on runs scored during their postseason runs.

Film

A movie based on the book was released in 2011. Actor Brad Pitt stars as Billy Beane, while Jonah Hill plays fictional character Peter Brand,  based on Paul DePodesta; Philip Seymour Hoffman plays A's manager Art Howe. Academy Award-winning screenwriter Steve Zaillian was hired to write the script, and Steven Soderbergh was slated to direct, replacing David Frankel. But in June 2009, because of conflicts over a revised script by Soderbergh, Sony put the movie on hold just days before it was scheduled to begin shooting. Soderbergh was eventually let go.

Bennett Miller took over directing duties, and Aaron Sorkin rewrote the script.  Shooting began in July 2010 at Blair Field, the Sports Stadium for Wilson High School (Long Beach, California), Sony Studios in Culver City, Dodger Stadium, and the Oakland-Alameda Coliseum. The film was released in theaters on September 23, 2011. Moneyball was nominated for six Academy Awards, including Best Actor and Best Picture.

In popular culture
The book is parodied in the 2010 Simpsons episode "MoneyBART", in which Lisa manages Bart's Little League baseball team using sabermetric principles. Bill James made an appearance in this episode.
The film adaptation is mentioned in Brooklyn Nine-Nine as being Captain Raymond Holt's favourite film because of the beauty of its statistical analysis.

See also

Evidence-based practices
Casey Award
Ball Four
Bull Durham
Nate Silver who developed PECOTA, the Player Empirical Comparison and Optimization Test Algorithm, to predict baseball player performance

References
Notes

External links

 Moneyball (book details) – The Official Michael Lewis website
 Majoring In Moneyball by John Manuel
 Billy Beane's Perfect Draft: A Baseball Revolution? by Richard van Zandt – guest column at BaseballEvolution.com (April 13, 2006)
 

2003 non-fiction books
Major League Baseball books
Books by Michael Lewis
Oakland Athletics
Non-fiction books adapted into films
Baseball statistics
Books about the San Francisco Bay Area